Alice Wong Chan Siu-ping  (Chan, born June 30, 1948) is a Canadian politician and a member of the Conservative Party who served as the member of Parliament (MP) for the electoral district of Richmond Centre from 2015 to 2021. She previously served as the MP for the Richmond riding from 2008 to 2015. In 2011, she was appointed by Prime Minister Stephen Harper to be Minister of State for Seniors, becoming the first Chinese-Canadian woman to serve in the Cabinet of Canada. She served in that position until 2015.

Early life

Wong immigrated to Canada from Hong Kong in 1980. She is a businesswoman and educator. She holds a PhD in Instruction and Curriculum from the University of British Columbia and worked as the manager of international programs at Kwantlen Polytechnic University. She also has taught ESL and entrepreneurship classes at Vancouver Community College where she founded the Centre for Small Business at VCC, which offered the first bilingual small business management classes for immigrants. Wong has also operated a consulting firm specializing in research and education.

She has served on the boards of various community organizations including the Rotary Club of Richmond, Rosewood Manor in Richmond, Benevolent Relief Seniors Care Society, Ethno Business Council, Chiu Chow Benevolent Association, and the Women's Enterprise Society of BC. She is a guest host on local Chinese and multicultural radio and television. Wong founded the Richmond Greenspace Society to promote green space in urban settings, improving passport office efficiency, raising funds to improve the safety of senior pedestrians, and raising funds for the Sichuan earthquake relief. She has been married to her husband Enoch since 1982.

Member of Parliament

Wong was first elected in 2008 in the riding of Richmond with 50% of the votes cast, compared to the incumbent Raymond Chan, who received 31%. In 2011, she was re-elected with 58% of the vote compared to 18% for her nearest rival. In 2015 she was re-elected in the riding of Richmond Centre with 44.2% of the vote compared to her nearest rival's 41.4%.

On May 18, 2011, Wong was appointed to Cabinet as Minister of State for Seniors. Reelected in 2015, she left the Cabinet as the Liberal Party gained a majority in the House of Commons.

She was re-elected in the 2019 federal election, but was excluded from new leader Erin O'Toole's Shadow Cabinet.

Wong was defeated in the 2021 Canadian federal election, losing Richmond Centre to Liberal Wilson Miao.

Political views
In the fall of 2012, Alice Wong stated that the government's top priorities focuses on job creation, economic growth and long-term prosperity.

Wong refused to play a role in the Canada Summer jobs program over the human rights statement supporting abortion and LGBT rights.

Abortion 
Wong is anti-abortion, and is a volunteer for the Campaign Life Coalition, a national organization which opposes abortion, same-sex marriage and gender identity legislation.

Wong voted in support of Bill C-233 - An Act to amend the Criminal Code (sex-selective abortion), which would restrict abortion access, making it a criminal offence for a medical practitioner to knowingly perform an abortion solely on the grounds of the child's genetic sex.

Abortion Rights Coalition of Canada has identified Wong's stance as anti-abortion.

Conversion Therapy 
On June 22, 2021, Wong was one of 63 MPs to vote against Bill C-6, An Act to amend the Criminal Code (conversion therapy), which was ultimately passed by majority vote, making certain aspects of conversion therapy a crime, including "causing a child to undergo conversion therapy."

Environment 
Her environmental platform has been criticized by the opposition for her views regarding shark fin soup because she was seen publicly eating the soup at a news conference in October 2012. Many environmentalists condemn the process of shark finning. She said in a statement, "If a product such as shark fin is derived from a legal, humane and sustainable harvest, we see no basis to restrict its trade".

Electoral record

See also
List of visible minority Canadian cabinet ministers
List of visible minority politicians in Canada

References

External links
Alice Wong official site

1948 births
Living people
Businesspeople from British Columbia
Canadian Christians
Canadian women in business
Women members of the House of Commons of Canada
Conservative Party of Canada MPs
Hong Kong emigrants to Canada
Members of the 28th Canadian Ministry
Members of the House of Commons of Canada from British Columbia
Members of the King's Privy Council for Canada
Naturalized citizens of Canada
People from Chaozhou
People from Richmond, British Columbia
University of British Columbia Faculty of Education alumni
Women in British Columbia politics
Women government ministers of Canada
21st-century Canadian women politicians